Armin (Armyn) is a given name or surname, and is:
 An ancient Indo-European name:
 a German/Dutch given name,
 a modern form of the name Arminius (18/17 BC–AD 21), a German prince who defeated a Roman army in the Battle of the Teutoburg Forest (the name Arminius being itself a Latinized form of a Germanic name which may have been derived from the element ermen meaning "whole, universal").
 a Persian given name.
 Son of Kai Kobad, a legendary character in Shahnameh, belonging to the mythical Kianian Dynasty in Persian literature and mythology;
 The  and short name of Ariobarzanes of Persis (or Ariobarzan), a Persian general who fought against Alexander the Great;
 The  of Ariobarzanes, meaning "exalting the Aryans" in ancient Persian.

Surname

 Robert Armin (–1615), English actor, member of the Lord Chamberlain's Men
 Mohsen Armin (born 1954), Iranian politician
 Jart Armin, cybersecurity expert

Given name
 Arminius, Germanic tribal leader who fought against the Romans
 Armin, Prince of Lippe (born 1924–2015)
 Armin Abron (born 1975), American periodontist
 Armin Bittner (born 1964), German former alpine skier
 Armin Joseph Deutsch (1918–1969), astronomer and science fiction writer
 Armin Hary (born 1937), the first non-American to win the Olympic 100 m since 1928
 Armin Hofmann (1920–2020), Swiss graphic designer
 Armin Kerer (born 1972), Italian former javelin thrower
 Armin Kogler (born 1959), Austrian retired ski jumper
 Armin Kõomägi (born 1969), Estonian writer and screenwriter
 Armin Laschet (born 1961), German politician
 Armin Lemme (born 1955), East German former discus thrower
 Armin Otto Leuschner (1868–1953), American astronomer and educator
 Armin Luistro (born 1961), Filipino religious brother
 Armin Mahbanoozadeh (born 1991), Iranian American figure skater
 Armin Meiwes (born 1961), German Internet user who became known as the "Rotenburg Cannibal"
 Armin Mueller-Stahl (born 1930), German film actor
 Armin Öpik (1898–1983), Estonian paleontologist
 Armin Rohde (born 1955), German actor  
 Armin S., German stock trader
 Armin Shimerman (born 1949), American actor
 Armin Sohrabian (born 1995), Iranian footballer
 Armin Tashakkori (born 1986), Iranian volleyball player
 Ármin Vámbéry (1832–1913), Hungarian explorer and writer
 Armin van Buuren (born 1976), Dutch trance music DJ and producer
 Armin Veh (born 1961), German footballer and manager
 Armin T. Wegner (1886–1978), German soldier, writer, and political activist
 Armin Wiebe (born 1948), Canadian writer
 Armin Zöggeler (born 1974), Italian luger
 Armin Hoseinpour nader (born 1994), DDS and researcher in Monash university

Fiction
 Armin Arlert, supporting protagonist of the manga and anime Attack on Titan
 Armin Tamzarian, the real name of principal Seymour Skinner on The Simpsons

See also
Armen (name)
Herman (name)
 Von Armin (disambiguation), several people
 Nepenthes armin (N. armin), a Philippine pitcher plant
 Stac an Armin, the Armin (Warrior) sea stack in Scotland

Masculine given names
Bosnian masculine given names
Estonian masculine given names
German masculine given names
Persian masculine given names
Iranian masculine given names